Listed below are the dates and results for the 1974 FIFA World Cup qualification rounds for the European zone (UEFA). For an overview of the qualification rounds, see the article 1974 FIFA World Cup qualification.

A total of 32 UEFA teams entered the competition. The European zone was allocated 9.5 places (out of 16) in the final tournament. West Germany, the hosts, qualified automatically, leaving 8.5 spots open for competition between 32 teams.

The 32 teams were divided into 9 groups of 3 or 4 teams each (four groups with 3 teams and five groups with 4 teams). The teams would play against each other on a home-and-away basis. The group winners would qualify, except the winner of Group 9, which would advance to the UEFA / CONMEBOL Intercontinental Play-off.

Groups

Group 1

Austria and Sweden finished level on points and goal difference, and a play-off on neutral ground was played to decide who would qualify. Sweden won to qualify for the World Cup.

Group 2

Group 3

Group 4

Group 5

Group 6

Group 7

Spain and Yugoslavia finished level on points and goal difference, and a play-off on neutral ground was played to decide who would qualify. Yugoslavia won to qualify for the World Cup.

Group 8

Group 9

The Soviet Union advanced to the UEFA–CONMEBOL play-off.

Inter-confederation play-offs

Goalscorers

7 goals

 Hristo Bonev
 Joachim Streich
 Gigi Riva
 Johan Cruyff

5 goals

 Willy Brokamp
 Florea Dumitrache
 Roland Sandberg

4 goals

 Raoul Lambert
 Jürgen Sparwasser
 Johan Neeskens
 Ralf Edström
 Bo Larsson

3 goals

 Josef Hickersberger
 Kurt Jara
 Georgi Denev
 Zdeněk Nehoda
 Bohumil Veselý
 Ferenc Bene
 Tor Egil Johansen
 Dušan Bajević

2 goals

 August Starek
 Léon Dolmans
 Odilon Polleunis
 Bozhil Kolev
 Bernd Bransch
 Hans-Jürgen Kreische
 Wolfram Löwe
 Lajos Kocsis
 Sándor Zámbó
 Terry Conroy
 Gianni Rivera
 Wim van Hanegem
 Trevor Anderson
 Harry Hestad
 Jan Domarski
 Robert Gadocha
 Rui Jordão
 Nené
 Ion Dumitru
 Dumitru Marcu
 Mircea Sandu
 Volodymyr Onyshchenko
 José Claramunt
 Rubén Óscar Valdez
 Ove Kindvall
 Osman Arpacıoğlu
 Stanislav Karasi

1 goal

 Sabah Bizi
 Mihal Gjika
 Ramazan Rragami
 Franz Hasil
 Roland Hattenberger
 Norbert Hof
 Helmut Köglberger
 Thomas Parits
 Peter Pumm
 Jean Dockx
 Paul van Himst
 Frans Janssens
 Atanas Mihaylov
 Kokos Antoniou
 Přemysl Bičovský
 Vladimír Hagara
 Ladislav Petráš
 Ole Bjørnmose
 Finn Laudrup
 Peter Ducke
 Colin Bell
 Allan Clarke
 Norman Hunter
 Jarmo Manninen
 Olavi Rissanen
 Miikka Toivola
 Georges Bereta
 Serge Chiesa
 Jean-Michel Larqué
 Antonis Antoniadis
 Mimis Domazos
 Kostas Eleftherakis
 Giorgos Koudas
 László Bálint
 Antal Dunai
 István Juhász
 Mihály Kozma
 Csaba Vidáts
 Elmar Geirsson
 Örn Óskarsson
 Mick Martin
 Ray Treacy
 Pietro Anastasi
 Fabio Capello
 Giorgio Chinaglia
 Nico Braun
 Gilbert Dussier
 Anton Camilleri
 Arie Haan
 Barry Hullshoff
 Theo de Jong
 Piet Keizer
 René van der Kerkhof
 Dick Schneider
 Sammy Morgan
 Liam O'Kane
 Martin O'Neill
 Jan Fuglset
 Tom Lund
 Per Pettersen
 Harald Sunde
 Grzegorz Lato
 Włodzimierz Lubański
 Humberto Coelho
 Eusébio
 Chico Faria
 Artur Jorge
 Alfredo Quaresma
 António Simões
 Emerich Dembrovschi
 Nicolae Dobrin
 Dudu Georgescu
 Radu Nunweiller
 Nicolae Pantea
 Teodor Tarălungă
 Jimmy Bone
 Kenny Dalglish
 Joe Harper
 Jim Holton
 Joe Jordan
 Peter Lorimer
 Lou Macari
 Willie Morgan
 Oleh Blokhin
 Vladimir Fedotov
 Viktor Kolotov
 Amancio Amaro
 Juan Manuel Asensi
 Roberto Juan Martínez
 Juan Cruz Sol
 Ove Grahn
 Dag Szepanski
 Rolf Blättler
 Karl Odermatt
 Köksal Mesçi
 Mehmet Türkkan
 Melih Atacan
 Trevor Hockey
 Leighton James
 John Toshack
 Jovan Aćimović
 Josip Katalinski
 Ivica Šurjak

1 own goal

 Einar Gunnarsson (playing against Belgium)
 Charles Spiteri (playing against Austria)
 Josip Katalinski (playing against Greece)

Notes

References

 
UEFA
FIFA World Cup qualification (UEFA)
World Cup